Khanna may refer to:

Places
 Khanna, Ludhiana, a city in the Ludhiana district of Punjab, India
 Khanna, Firozpur, a village in Firozpur district of Punjab, India
 Khanna Chamaran, a village in Gurdaspur district of Punjab, India
 Khanna Majra, a village in Ambala district of Haryana, India

Name
 Khanna (name), a surname found among the Khatris of Punjab region including a list of people with this name
 Khanna Omarkhali, Russian writer